Task Force Delta is a generic military, or quasi-military (police, firefighters, etc), designation for a specific task force — a small temporary unit or detachment configured for a specific purpose or task. (A unit called Task Force Delta is often a part of a sequence of Task Forces Alpha, Bravo, Charlie, Delta, Echo, etc.)

Task Force Delta may refer to:
A task force consisting of four infantry battalions of U.S. Marines and part of Operation Hastings and Operation Texas in Vietnam in 1966
An element of the 1st Marine Air Wing operating from the Royal Thai Air Base Nam Phong in Thailand in 1972-1973
Task Force Delta (psychic adepts), an ad hoc working group of 300 U.S. Army psychic adepts organized by Col. Frank Burns 
A unit of the Filipino Bureau of Fire Protection
Task Force Delta, a fictional covert U.S. government agency in the Chase comic book series published by DC Comics

See also
 Delta Force (disambiguation)
 Delta (disambiguation)

Ad hoc units and formations
Task forces